The Motorola i455 is an iDEN mobile phone offered by Boost Mobile. It replaces the discontinued i450. The i455 is usually black. It has a 600 entry phonebook, push-to-talk service, polyphonic ringtones, speakerphone and messaging.

See also
 List of Motorola products
 Motorola

External links 
 Boost Mobile

I455